Deep Foundations Institute (DFI) is an international association of contractors, engineers, manufacturers, suppliers, academics and owners in the deep foundations industry. 

DFI was incorporated as a 501(c)6 association in January 1976. It was founded by Jack Dougherty and Hal Hunt during the “Pile Talk” seminars and became a multidisciplinary worldwide membership organization.

Technical committees 

 Augered Cast-in-Place and Drilled Displacement Pile
 Anchored Earth Retention
 BIM and Digitalisation (Europe)
 Continuous Flight Auger Pile (India)
 Codes and Standards
 Deep Foundations for Landslides and Slope Stabilization
 Drilled Shaft
 Driven Pile
 Electric Power Foundation Systems
 Geotechnical Characterization for Foundations (India)
 Ground Improvement
 Helical Piles and Tiebacks
 Information Management Systems
 International Grouting
 Manufacturers, Suppliers and Service Providers
 Micropile
 Risk and Contracts
 Seismic and Lateral Loads
 Structural Slurry Wall and Seepage Control
 Soil Mixing
 Subsurface Characterization for Deep Foundations
 Sustainability
 Testing and Evaluation
 Tunneling and Underground
 Women in Deep Foundations

International chapters 
DFI currently supports chapters in Europe, Middle East and India.

 DFI Europe was formed in 2005 as a DFI Regional Chapter for European DFI Members, who enjoy the benefits of joint DFI and DFI Europe membership. DFI Europe’s secretariat is located in Belgium.
 DFI Middle East was formed in 2010 following a successful Piling Summit in Dubai, UAE. The Regional Chapter provides joint membership in DFI and DFI Middle East.
 DFI of India was formed in 2013 following the success of the Deep Foundation Technologies for Infrastructure Development in India held in Chennai, India in 2012. The Regional Chapter provides joint membership in DFI and DFI of India.

References

External links
Deep Foundations Institute Website
DFI Corporate Member Directory of Foundation Specialists
DFI Europe Website
DFI India Website
DFI Educational Trust Webpage

501(c)(6) nonprofit organizations